Dry Creek Power Station is a power station at Dry Creek in the northern suburbs of Adelaide, South Australia. It is owned and operated by Synergen Power, a joint venture of Engie and Mitsui. The power station has three open cycle gas turbines, each rated at 52MW. It was commissioned in 1973–1974 by the Electricity Trust of South Australia.

As well as peaking electricity generation, the power station also provides ancillary services to support electricity grid stability. Dry Creek Power Station was established around 1978. It receives gas from the Moomba Adelaide Pipeline System. In 2018, the operators of Dry Creek Power Station were fined  for failing to respond to instructions from AEMO during a blackout caused by faults elsewhere in the network.

References

Natural gas-fired power stations in South Australia
Buildings and structures in Adelaide
1978 establishments in Australia